Ryan Young Park (born 1983) is a Korean-American lawyer who currently serves as the solicitor general of North Carolina. A lecturer at Duke University and the University of North Carolina at Chapel Hill, he has written for publications such as The Atlantic, The New York Times and The Washington Post.

Park represented the University of North Carolina at Chapel Hill in the Supreme Court case Students for Fair Admissions, Inc. v. University of North Carolina (merged with Students for Fair Admissions v. President and Fellows of Harvard College).

Early life and education 
The son of Korean immigrants, Park grew up in St. Paul, Minnesota. He matriculated at Amherst College before enrolling at Harvard Law School, where he graduated with a Juris Doctor, summa cum laude. After graduating, he served as a clerk on the U.S. Supreme Court for Justices David Souter and Ruth Bader Ginsburg. In addition, he also clerked for Judges Robert A. Katzmann and Jed S. Rakoff.

From 2006 until 2007, he received a Fulbright Scholarship to teach English at a boys' school in South Korea.

Career 
Park previously served as legal counsel to both the U.S. State Department and the U.S. Department of Justice. Afterwards, he became a deputy solicitor general of North Carolina, succeeding Matt Sawchak as solicitor general on March 31, 2022.

He is a lecturer at Duke University and the University of North Carolina School of Law.

Personal life 
Park is married to Eunee Kathleen, whom he met while they were both undergraduates at Amherst College.

References

External links 
 Profile at Duke University
 Profile on C-SPAN
 Affidavit of Service to the Supreme Court

Duke University School of Law faculty
University of North Carolina School of Law faculty
Amherst College alumni
Harvard Law School alumni
American people of Korean descent
People from Saint Paul, Minnesota
Solicitors General of North Carolina
1980s births
Living people